Magloire is a Breton saint.

Magloire may also refer to:

 Magloire (surname), a surname
 Magloire Ambroise (1774–1807), Haitian rebel slave